Volker Mayer-Lay (born 22 June 1981) is a German politician for the CDU and since 2021 member of the Bundestag, the federal diet.

Life and politics 

Mayer-Lay was born 1981 in the West German town of Ueberlingen and studied law in order to become a lawyer.
Mayer-Lay became a member of the Bundestag in 1981.

References 

Living people
1981 births
Christian Democratic Union of Germany politicians
21st-century German politicians
Members of the Bundestag 2021–2025